The 2018–19 Chicago Blackhawks season was the 93rd season for the National Hockey League franchise that was established on September 25, 1926. The Blackhawks were coached by Joel Quenneville, in his 11th season as the Blackhawks' head coach, for the first 15 games of the season. On November 6, 2018, Quenneville was fired and Jeremy Colliton was named the new head coach.

The Blackhawks were eliminated from playoff contention on April 2, 2019. This marked the first time since the 2006–07 and 2007–08 seasons that the Blackhawks had missed the playoffs in back-to-back seasons. The Blackhawks finished the season 36–34–12 to finish in sixth place in the Central Division. 

Patrick Kane led the team in scoring, scoring 44 goals and  a regular season career-high of 110 points. Alex DeBrincat scored 41 goals in his second season in the NHL while Jonathan Toews had a resurgent year, scoring a regular season career-high in goals (35) and points (81).

Standings

Schedule and results

Preseason
The preseason schedule was published on June 15, 2018.

Regular season
The regular season schedule was released on June 21, 2018.

Detailed records

Player statistics
As of April 6, 2019

Skaters

Goaltenders

†Denotes player spent time with another team before joining the Blackhawks. Stats reflect time with the Blackhawks only.
‡Denotes player was traded mid-season. Stats reflect time with the Blackhawks only.
Bold/italics denotes franchise record.

Awards and honours

Awards

Milestones

Records
 Brent Seabrook – Blackhawks' all-time leader in regular season games played by a defenseman (1,009 games) (October 13, 2018)
 Brent Seabrook – Blackhawks' third all-time in regular season games played (1,014 games) (October 25, 2018)
 Corey Crawford – Blackhawks' third all-time in regular season games played by a goalie (416 games) (November 4, 2018)
 Duncan Keith and Brent Seabrook – first pair of defensemen to play 1,000 games together as teammates (December 11, 2018)
 Brent Seabrook – Blackhawks' second all-time in regular season games played (1,037 games) (December 12, 2018)
 Patrick Kane – Blackhawks' third all-time in regular season assists (555 assists) (January 20, 2019)
 Patrick Kane – Blackhawks' all-time record for consecutive games with an assist (20 games) (February 22, 2019)
 Patrick Kane - NHL second all-time in regular season for consecutive games with an assist (20 games) (February 22, 2019)
 Patrick Kane - Blackhawks' fourth all-time record for career points (924 points) (March 7, 2019)

Transactions
The Blackhawks have been involved in the following transactions during the 2018–19 season.

Trades

Free agents

Waivers

Contract terminations

Retirement

Signings

Draft picks

Below are the Chicago Blackhawks's selections at the 2018 NHL Entry Draft, which was held on June 22 and 23, 2018, at the American Airlines Center in Dallas, Texas.

Notes:
 The Nashville Predators' first-round pick went to the Chicago Blackhawks as the result of a trade on February 26, 2018, that sent Ryan Hartman and a fifth-round pick in 2018 to Nashville in exchange for Victor Ejdsell, a fourth-round pick in 2018 and this pick.
 The Calgary Flames' third-round pick went to the Chicago Blackhawks as the result of a trade on June 23, 2018, that sent the Toronto Maple Leafs' third-round pick (87th overall), and the Columbus Blue Jackets fifth-round (142nd overall) to the Arizona Coyotes in exchange for this pick. The Toronto Maple Leafs' third-round pick went to the Chicago Blackhawks as the result of a trade on February 19, 2018, that sent Michal Kempny to Washington in exchange for this pick (being conditional at the time of the trade). The Columbus Blue Jackets' fifth-round pick went to the Chicago Blackhawks as the result of a trade on June 23, 2017, that sent Artemi Panarin, Tyler Motte and the Islanders' sixth-round pick in 2017 to Columbus in exchange for Brandon Saad, Anton Forsberg and this pick.
 The Florida Panthers' fifth-round pick went to the Chicago Blackhawks as the result of a trade on June 23, 2018, that sent a fifth-round pick in 2019 to the Montreal Canadiens in exchange for this pick.

References

2018-19
2018–19 NHL season by team
Chicago Blackhawks
Chicago Blackhawks
2010s in Chicago
Chicago Blackhawks
Chicago Blackhawks